Mohit Kumar can refer to:

 Mohit Kumar (cricketer, born 1996), Indian cricketer
 Mohit Kumar (Bihar cricketer) (born 1998), Indian cricketer